The  is a limited express train service for commuters on the Chūō Rapid Line and Ōme Line operated by East Japan Railway Company (JR East). The train operates on weekdays only. All seats are reserved on this train.

Route
Tokyo - Shinjuku - Tachikawa - Haijima - Kabe - Ōme

Service outline

As Ōme 
From the timetable change of March 14 2020, the Ōme currently runs as follows:

Morning

Ōme Ltd. Express 2: Ōme (06:16) to Tokyo (07:31)

Evening

Ōme Ltd. Express 1: Tokyo (18:30) to Ōme (19:49)
Ōme Ltd. Express 3: Tokyo (22:15) to Ōme (23:24)

As Ōme Liner

Morning

 Ōme Liner: Ōme to Tokyo

Evening

 Ōme Liner 1: Tokyo to Ōme
 Ōme Liner 3: Tokyo to Ōme
 Ōme Liner 5: Tokyo to Ōme

History 

JR East announced a new timetable revision which took effect from 16 March 2019 onward. It announced the discontinuation of the Chūō Liner and the Ōme Liner, which was replaced by two new limited express services, the Hachiōji Limited Express  (はちおうじ) and the Ōme Limited Express (おうめ) respectively. The Ōme Ltd. Express operates less services than the former Ōme Liner, with one Tokyo-bound train during the morning rush, and two Ōme-bound trains during the evening rush. With this, a new ticketing system is now implemented, in which limited express tickets can be purchased in advance, unlike the Liner tickets which can only be bought on the day of boarding.

Rolling stock

Current rolling stock 

 E353 series (since March 16, 2019)

Past rolling stock

 183 series 9-car EMUs (from March 16, 1991 until June 29, 2002)
E257 series 9-car EMUs (since July 1, 2002 until March 15, 2019)

Formation

Current formation

Ōme E353 series

Past formation

Ōme Liner E257 series

See also
Hachiōji (train), formerly Chūō Liner, a similar limited express service
 List of named passenger trains of Japan

References 
 JR Timetable, March 2008 issue
 "2008 年3 月ダイヤ改正について" JR East Hachiōji Branch news release, 20 December 2007 (Japanese)

East Japan Railway Company
Named passenger trains of Japan
Railway services introduced in 1991
1991 establishments in Japan